The imperial election of August 21, 1400 was an imperial election held to select the emperor of the Holy Roman Empire.  It took place in Rhens.

Background 
Wenceslaus IV of Bohemia, king of Bohemia, had been elected Holy Roman Emperor in the imperial election of 1376.

On September 20, 1378, the cardinals elected Antipope Clement VII pope in opposition to Pope Urban VI, whom they had come to distrust.  The existence of two popes in opposition to one another, called the Western Schism, led to escalating international crises as the kings of Europe were forced to choose sides.  On November 29 Wenceslaus's father Charles IV, Holy Roman Emperor died, and Wenceslaus acceded to the throne.  Civil unrest in Bohemia prevented Wenceslaus from effectively administering the empire; he declined even to have a coronation ceremony as Holy Roman Emperor.

Because of Wenceslaus's weak rule and his failure to stamp out civil unrest or resolve the Western Schism, three of the prince-electors of the empire convened to remove him at the imperial election of May 22, 1400.  However, the remaining electors, including Wenceslaus himself, did not accept the results of the election, and their candidate, Frederick I, Duke of Brunswick-Lüneburg, was murdered on June 5.

Now four electors convened to depose Wenceslaus.  They were:

 Johann II von Nassau, elector of Mainz
 Werner of Falkenstein, elector of Trier
 Frederick III of Saarwerden, elector of Cologne
 Rupert, King of Germany, elector of the Electoral Palatinate (who had also participated in the May election).

They declared Wenceslaus deposed on August 20.

Elected 
Rupert was elected on August 21.

Aftermath 
As Wenceslaus and the electors of Saxony and Brandenburg were absent, Wenceslaus did not recognize the validity of his deposition or Rupert's election.  Neither did the Free Imperial City of Aachen allow him entrance.  He was therefore crowned Holy Roman Emperor at Cologne on January 6, 1401 by Frederick III.  Wenceslaus was arrested in March 1402 by his brother Sigismund, who would later become Holy Roman Emperor himself, ending the resistance of his partisans.

1401
1400 in the Holy Roman Empire
14th-century elections
Non-partisan elections